In geometry, the great dirhombicosidodecacron is a nonconvex isohedral polyhedron. It is the dual of the great dirhombicosidodecahedron.

In Magnus Wenninger's Dual Models, it is represented with intersecting infinite prisms passing through the model center, cut off at a certain point that is convenient for the maker. Wenninger suggested these figures are members of a new class of stellation polyhedra, called stellation to infinity. However, he also acknowledged that strictly speaking they are not polyhedra because their construction does not conform to the usual definitions.

References
  p. 139

External links 
 

Dual uniform polyhedra